María de Villota Comba (13 January 1979 – 11 October 2013) was a Spanish racing driver. She was the daughter of former Formula One driver Emilio de Villota, and sister of Emilio de Villota Jr., who similarly competed in Formula Palmer Audi. Prior to her death, De Villota was recovering from serious head and facial injuries, sustained during an accident in straight-line testing as the Marussia Formula One team test driver.

Early career
De Villota was born in Madrid. She competed in numerous racing series, including the World Touring Car Championship and ADAC Procar Series. In August 2009, she signed with Atlético Madrid to race for the remainder of the season in the Superleague Formula open wheel racing series. She remained with the Atlético Madrid team until the series folded in 2011. She also competed in the 2005 24 Hours of Daytona endurance race.

Formula One
On 18 August 2011, the Lotus Renault GP team confirmed reports that De Villota had made her Formula One test debut in a Renault R29 at the Paul Ricard Circuit, and that her management was in talks to secure her a test driver seat in the future. In December she reiterated her desire to work with the team in 2012, adding that she was in advanced talks over a third driver role.

On 7 March 2012, it was announced that María de Villota had joined Marussia F1 Team as a test driver, with the opportunity to sample Formula One machinery later in the year.

Duxford Aerodrome testing accident

At approximately 9:30 on 3 July 2012, De Villota was involved in an accident at Duxford Aerodrome in England while carrying out straight-line testing for Marussia, her first time in the car. Her car crashed into a stationary truck at the end of a test run when it had just returned to the service area. A BBC reporter who witnessed the accident estimated the car was travelling at between  when it crashed. It took an hour for her to be removed from the car and she was taken to Addenbrooke's Hospital in Cambridgeshire with life-threatening head and facial injuries. She was later reported to be conscious. The following day, Marussia team principal John Booth said De Villota remained in a "critical but stable" condition in hospital and had lost her right eye.

On 6 July, the Marussia Technical Centre said that following an operation that day, her condition in relation to her head injury had improved. On 16 July, Marussia said the car was not at fault. Team principal John Booth said: "We are satisfied the findings of our internal investigation exclude the car as a factor in the accident". After a stay of 17 days, De Villota left the hospital and returned to Spain, having escaped severe neurological damage.

De Villota made her first public appearance since the accident in October 2012, giving an exclusive interview to ¡Hola! magazine and then hosting a press conference for the general media. She revealed that she had lost her senses of smell and taste, still suffered from headaches, and was scheduled to undergo further surgery, but that she was open to a future return to racing if she were to be granted a licence, and that she also wished to become involved in promoting safety improvements in motorsport. She released a computer graphic which showed the extent of her initial cranial injuries.

In 2015, an official report compiled by the Health and Safety Executive concluded that De Villota had not received full guidance on how to stop the car, and was caught out by its anti-stall system, which activated as she attempted to brake to a standstill and pushed the car forward into the tail-lift of the team's service truck.

Personal life
De Villota married Rodrigo García Millán, a personal trainer and owner of Oxigeno Training, on 28 July 2013 in Seville, less than three months before her death.

Death
On the morning of 11 October 2013, exactly one year from her first public appearance after her testing accident, Spanish media reported that De Villota, aged 33, had been found dead in her Seville hotel room; Eurosport reported that her family had confirmed her death. An autopsy confirmed De Villota had suffered a cardiac arrest. While her death was initially reported to be by "absolutely natural causes", according to a statement released by her family, a forensic doctor later confirmed that De Villota's death was a consequence of neurological injuries suffered in her F1 testing crash the previous year.

At the time of her death, De Villota was scheduled to participate as a speaker at the Seville Fundación Lo Que De Verdad Importa (LQDVI) conference and was due to launch her autobiography Life Is a Gift on 14 October.
Her remains were cremated on 12 October 2013 in Seville.

Circuito del Jarama tributes

The Circuito del Jarama has organised two tributes to her.  On 5 July 2017, the final turn on the circuit that leads to the pit straight was named Curva María de Villota in her memory. 

The circuit since 2014 organised an annual Christmas Eve foot race at the circuit, the María de Villota 10km and 5km, as a fundraiser.Official Circuito del Jarama video announcing Maria de Villota turn at Jarama

Books
 La vida es un regalo ("Life Is a Gift", 2013)

Decorations
  Golden Medal of the Royal Order of Sports Merit (Real Orden del Mérito Deportivo, 29/10/2013).

Motorsports career results

Grand-Am Series

World Touring Car Championship
(key) (Races in bold indicate pole position) (Races in italics indicate fastest lap)

Euroseries 3000
(key) (Races in bold indicate pole position) (Races in italics indicate fastest lap)

Superleague Formula
(key) (Races in bold indicate pole position) (Races in italics indicate fastest lap)

† Non Championship round

References

External links
 
 
 

2013 deaths
Sportspeople from Madrid
Spanish racing drivers
Spanish female racing drivers
Euroformula Open Championship drivers
24 Hours of Daytona drivers
Auto GP drivers
Formula Palmer Audi drivers
Superleague Formula drivers
World Touring Car Championship drivers
Superstars Series drivers
Spanish autobiographers
Women autobiographers
Neurological disease deaths in Spain
Racing Engineering drivers
De Villota Motorsport drivers
Alan Docking Racing drivers
1979 births